Werner Max Sollors (born June 6, 1943) is Henry B. and Anne M. Cabot Professor of English and of African American Studies at Harvard University. He is also Global Professor of Literature at New York University Abu Dhabi.

Background 
Sollors received a doctorate in philosophy in 1975 from the Free University of Berlin.

Academic appointments
Freie Universität Berlin, Berlin, West Germany, assistant professor of American studies, 1970–77
Columbia University, New York City, assistant professor, 1975–82, associate professor of English, 1982–83
Harvard University, Cambridge, Massachusetts
Andrew W. Mellon faculty fellow, 1977–78
professor of American literature and Language and Afro-American Studies, 1983--
Henry B. and Anne M. Cabot Professor of English Literature, 1988--
Walter Channing Cabot fellow, 1997–98
Washington University in St. Louis, Hurst Professor, 2004–05
Indiana University, Bloomington, IN, Patten Lecturer, 2008–09
University of Texas at San Antonio, Brackenridge Distinguished Visiting Professor, 2009
Ca' Foscari University of Venice

Work 
His writings include Beyond Ethnicity: Consent and Descent in American Culture (1986), Neither Black Nor White and Yet Both: Thematic Explorations of Interracial Literature (1997), Ethnic Modernism (2008), and The Temptation of Despair: Tales of the 1940s (2014). He was also the editor for the Modern Library Classics release of Georges by Alexandre Dumas.

            

 also 2007

References

External links 
 Harvard faculty profile

Black studies scholars
Harvard University faculty
Free University of Berlin alumni
University of Texas at San Antonio faculty
Columbia University faculty
German emigrants to the United States
German scholars
West German expatriates in the United States
1943 births
Living people
People from Kronberg im Taunus
Washington University in St. Louis faculty
Indiana University Bloomington faculty
Academic staff of the Ca' Foscari University of Venice